Lakshman Singh Jayanthi  is an Indian professional kabaddi player. She was member of the India national kabaddi team that won Asian games gold medals in 2014 in Incheon.

References

Living people
Indian kabaddi players
Asian Games medalists in kabaddi
Kabaddi players at the 2014 Asian Games
Year of birth missing (living people)
Asian Games gold medalists for India
Medalists at the 2014 Asian Games
Place of birth missing (living people)